Skyscraper is a 2018 American action thriller film written and directed by Rawson Marshall Thurber. Produced by Legendary Pictures, Seven Bucks Productions and FlynnPictureCo., the film stars Dwayne Johnson in the lead role, Neve Campbell, Chin Han, Roland Møller, Noah Taylor, Byron Mann, Pablo Schreiber, and Hannah Quinlivan. In the film, Will Sawyer, a former FBI agent, must rescue his family from a newly built Hong Kong skyscraper, the tallest in the world, after terrorists set the building on fire in an attempt to extort the property developer. The first non-comedy of Thurber's career, it also marks his second collaboration with Johnson, following Central Intelligence (2016).

Development started in May 2016 when Legendary Entertainment won the bidding war for a Chinese-set action adventure film. Johnson were cast to play the lead, while Thurber was attached as the film's scriptwriter, director and producer, with Flynn producing the film through his Flynn Picture Company, alongside Johnson's Seven Bucks Productions, with Universal handling distribution rights. Apart from Johnson's casting, the casting call began from June to August 2017. Filming began in August 2017 in Vancouver, British Columbia, Canada. Additional photography and exteriors were filmed at the Hong Kong Cultural Centre.

Skyscraper premiered in Beijing, on July 1, 2018 and was released in the United States by Universal Pictures on July 13, 2018, in 2D and RealD 3D formats. Skyscraper underperformed at the box office, grossing over $304 million worldwide against its production budget of $125 million and prompting Legendary to end its distribution deal with Universal. The film received mixed reviews from critics, who praised Johnson's performance and the film's suspenseful scenes, but criticized the story as clichéd and too similar to The Towering Inferno (1974) and Die Hard (1988).

Plot 
Will Sawyer, a Marine veteran turned FBI Hostage Rescue Team commander, loses his left leg below the knee when he and HRT colleague Ben Gillespie encounter a hostage taker with a suicide bomb.

Ten years later, Sawyer is a private security consultant who, on a recommendation from Gillespie, is hired to review security for the world’s tallest skyscraper, Hong Kong’s 3,500-feet (appx. 1,060-meter), 225-floor tower, "The Pearl", for owner Zhao Long Ji. Sawyer is joined by his wife, Sarah, and twin children, Georgia and Henry, staying with him on the not-yet-opened residential floors. Sawyer meets with Zhao, Gillespie, security director Okeke and head insurance underwriter Pierce, to report that the computerized fire and security systems have passed his tests, though he needs to inspect the offsite security center. Zhao provides him with a tablet that gives Sawyer complete control over the Pearl’s systems. Sawyer and Gillespie head to the offsite facility, but a thief hired by international terrorist Kores Botha attempts to steal the tablet. Gillespie reveals he is also working for Botha and attacks Sawyer for the tablet, but the confrontation concludes with Gillespie dying.

Botha and a group of his men break into the Pearl and undermine the safety systems by using a water-reactive chemical to start a fire on the 96th floor, creating a barrier that renders it impossible to enter to or exit from the upper 130 floors. Sawyer tries to return to the Pearl, but is attacked by Xia, one of Botha's associates. Xia and her agents take the tablet and kill everyone at the offsite facility. They then use the tablet to disable the fire-extinguishing systems in the Pearl and activate the air vents to spread the fire to the upper floors. Zhao and Okeke send security guards to rescue Sawyer's family, but the guards are killed by an explosion and the family is believed dead. Urged on by Pierce, Zhao orders the remaining personnel to evacuate via helicopter, but Pierce reveals he is also an agent for Botha, killing all but Zhao, who escapes into his penthouse apartment and subsequently locking it down from any intrusion.

Inspector Wu leads the local police to secure the Pearl and capture Sawyer, who is believed to be behind the incidents. Sawyer evades them and makes his way into the Pearl above the fire barrier using a crane from an adjacent building. Sawyer kills Pierce before Pierce can kill Sawyer's family, though Georgia is separated from the others. Sawyer has Sarah and Henry ride through the fire barrier in a free-fall elevator before applying the emergency brakes, letting them escape safely; Sarah immediately explains the situation to Wu and that Botha's men will likely escape via parachute to a nearby landing zone. Sawyer searches for Georgia, and after finding her they are captured by Botha, who demands Zhao in return for Georgia. Sawyer is forced to dangerously scale the outside of the building to access the security panel for Zhao's penthouse, then enters and confronts Zhao. Zhao explains that Botha had extorted money from him during the $6 billion construction project, but Zhao kept a detailed computer file of the transactions, which can reveal accounts and names of three crime syndicates Botha works for; Botha instigated the attack to obtain the records.

Sawyer brings Zhao to Botha at the top of the skyscraper, acquiescing to the trade for Georgia. However, Zhao distracts Botha, allowing Sawyer and Zhao to kill Botha's thugs. Botha grabs Georgia and threatens to drop her off the building, but Sawyer outsmarts him, rescues Georgia, and leaves Botha to die in a grenade explosion as he falls. Wu leads an attack on the likely dropzone, securing Xia and killing her thugs. Sarah recovers the tablet and uses it to restart the Pearl’s systems, extinguishing the blaze. Sawyer, Georgia, and Zhao are brought down safely by helicopter, and the Sawyer family happily reunites while Wu acknowledges and finally meets and greets Sawyer. Zhao states his intention to rebuild the Pearl, shown to have massive fire damage extending from the 96th floor to the roof.

Cast
Dwayne Johnson as Will Sawyer, a former US Marine, FBI Hostage Rescue Team leader and amputee, who now assesses security for skyscrapers.
Neve Campbell as Sarah Sawyer, Will's wife, a former US Navy surgeon.
Chin Han as Zhao Long Ji, a wealthy Chinese tech entrepreneur and financier of the Pearl.
Roland Møller as Kores Botha, a South African terrorist kingpin who plans to control the Pearl skyscraper by starting a fire in random places so he will withdraw millions of dollars in shakedown payments.
Noah Taylor as Mr. Pierce, an insurance executive, secretly working for Botha.
Byron Mann as Inspector Wu, leader of the HKPF response team.
Pablo Schreiber as Ben Gillespie, Will's former colleague and friend, secretly works for Botha.
Hannah Quinlivan as Xia, Botha's henchwoman.
Tzi Ma as Fire Chief Sheng.
McKenna Roberts as Georgia Sawyer, Will and Sarah's daughter and Henry's twin sister.
Noah Cottrell as Henry Sawyer, Will and Sarah's son and Georgia's twin brother.
Elfina Luk as HKPF Sergeant Han.
Adrian Holmes as Ajani Okeke, Zhao's head-of-security and personal bodyguard.
Matt O'Leary as the Skinny Hacker, Botha's computer expert.
Kevin Rankin as Ray, the father who holds his family hostage in the film's opening.

Production 
On May 26, 2016, it was announced that Legendary Entertainment had won the bidding war for a Chinese-set action adventure film, Skyscraper, in which Dwayne Johnson was set to play the lead. Rawson Marshall Thurber was attached as the film's scriptwriter, director and  producer, with Beau Flynn producing the film through his Flynn Picture Company, alongside Johnson's Seven Bucks Productions, with Universal Pictures handling distribution rights. On June 22, 2017, it was reported that Neve Campbell had signed on to play the wife of Johnson's character, a role where Maggie Q, Rachel Bilson, Jaimie Alexander and Mira Sorvino were also considered. In July 2017, Chin Han and Pablo Schreiber joined the cast. In August 2017, Byron Mann, Hannah Quinlivan, Noah Taylor, and Roland Møller were added to the cast.

Adrian Smith + Gordon Gill Architecture consulted the film production on the design of the fictitious 225-story megatall skyscraper, with Adrian Smith quoted as saying that "the producer wanted this to be a tower based on real possibilities". Smith advised "on issues that tall buildings face in real life and design aspects like wind behaviour, tower movement, elevator systems and how supertall towers can become cities within the tower". The architectural rendering of the skyscraper was based on Chinese inspirations, particularly a twisting dragon with a pearl in its mouth. According to the New York Post, "production designer Jim Bissell and his team researched local myths for inspiration and came upon a Chinese fable they could work with." The skyscraper is located where the real-life Hong Kong Cultural Centre is situated.

Principal photography on the film began on August 14, 2017, in Vancouver, British Columbia. Additional photography and exteriors were filmed at the Hong Kong Cultural Centre.

During post-production, the visual effects were provided by Moving Picture Company, Method Studios, Image Engine and Industrial Light & Magic; the visuals were supervised by Craig Hammack, Jose Burgos, Bernhard Kimbacher and Jason Billington.

Music

Steve Jablonsky composed the film's score which uses elements of guitars, synthesised drums and traditional orchestra. The soundtrack was digitally released on July 13, 2018 by Milan Records with the physical soundtrack being released later on August 3, 2018. British singer and songwriter Jamie N Commons performed the song "Walls" which plays in the end credits of the film.

Marketing
Universal released the first official trailer in February 2018 and the second trailer on May 23, 2018. Promo posters in the form of The Towering Inferno (1974) and Die Hard (1988) were created, referencing the stylistic links between those films and Skyscraper.

Release 

Skyscraper was released in the United States, as well as several international territories, in 3D and standard formats on July 13, 2018, by Universal Pictures. The film also secured a July 20, 2018 release date in China, a rarity as mainstream Hollywood films are seldom released there during the month of July, to make room for domestic films.  Skyscraper premiered in Beijing, on July 1, 2018 and also held a screening in Hong Kong on July 7, 2018. Skyscraper was released digitally on September 25, 2018, and released on Blu-ray, DVD, Blu-ray 3D and Ultra HD Blu-ray on October 2, 2018.

Reception

Box office
Skyscraper grossed $68.4 million in the United States and Canada and $236.4 million in other territories for a total worldwide gross of $304.9 million against a production budget of $125 million.

In the United States and Canada, Skyscraper was released alongside the opening of Hotel Transylvania 3: Summer Vacation, as well as the wide expansion of Sorry to Bother You, and was initially projected to gross $32–40 million from 3,782 theaters in its opening weekend. However, after making $1.95 million during Thursday night screenings (down from the $2.4 million made by Johnson's Rampage the past April) and $9.3 million on its first day, weekend estimates were lowered to $24 million. The film ended up debuting at $24.9 million, finishing third, behind Hotel Transylvania 3: Summer Vacation and Ant-Man and the Wasp. Deadline Hollywood attributed the low figure to audiences having seen the plot before in other films and the July release date being at the height of the crowded summer movie season, as well as the possibility that filmgoers had become tired of seeing Johnson so frequently (although the site noted that 72% of people who bought tickets to Skyscraper did so because of him). In its second weekend, the film made $11.4 million and finished sixth, and in its third, made $5.4 million, finishing ninth.

The film debuted at $47.7 million in China, finishing first at the country's box office and bringing the two-week global foreign total to $132.8 million. In its third weekend of international release, the film added another $17.8 million, including $7 million in China (for a running-cume of $86 million).

Skyscraper concluded 2018 as the 31st-highest-grossing film of the year worldwide.

Critical reception
 On Metacritic, which assigns a weighted average rating to reviews, the film has a score of 51 out of 100, based on 42 critics, indicating "mixed or average reviews". Audiences polled by CinemaScore gave the film an average grade of "B+" on an A+ to F scale.

Alonso Duralde of TheWrap called the film a "satisfying summer thriller," while acknowledging the familiar plot, and writing, "Skyscraper doesn't change the action-movie game the way Die Hard did, but it's a solidly entertaining summer diversion best enjoyed on the biggest theater — or even better, drive-in — screen you can find." Varietys Peter Debruge was more critical of the story but praised Johnson, saying, "This is escapism, pure and simple, and though the structure is rickety, by enlisting Johnson, Thurber ensures that his Skyscraper is built on solid Rock."

Writing for Entertainment Weekly, Chris Nashawaty found the film to be a weak clone of Die Hard, giving it a "C−" rating and stating: "It's all passively watchable, but the main problem is that writer-director Rawson Marshall Thurber (Central Intelligence) hasn't come up with a villain nearly as memorable as Alan Rickman's Hans Gruber. I know that comparison may seem unfair, but when you're ripping off Die Hard this shamelessly, it's kind of not."

Accolades

See also 
The Towering Inferno
Die Hard
The Tower

References

External links 
 
 

2018 films
2018 3D films
2018 action thriller films
2010s disaster films
American action thriller films
American disaster films
Films about amputees
Films about arson
Films about families
Films about terrorism in Asia
Films directed by Rawson Marshall Thurber
Films produced by Beau Flynn
Films produced by Dwayne Johnson
Films scored by Steve Jablonsky
Films set in Minnesota
Films set in Hong Kong
Films shot in Vancouver
Films about hostage takings
Legendary Pictures films
Seven Bucks Productions films
Films about high-rise fires
Universal Pictures films
2010s English-language films
2010s American films